The following is a comprehensive discography of Tristania, a Norwegian gothic metal band that formed in 1995. It was founded by Anders Høyvik Hidle and Morten Veland; Veland later left to form Sirenia. The band has released seven studio albums, one demo, one video album and two EPs.

Albums

Video albums

Compilation albums

EPs

Demos

Music videos

Evenfall (1998)
Equilibrium (2005)
Libre (2005)
Year of the Rat (2010)

References

Discographies of Norwegian artists
Heavy metal group discographies